The New Zealand national cricket team visited Zimbabwe in September 2000 and played a two-match Test series against the Zimbabwean national cricket team. New Zealand won the Test series 2–0. New Zealand were captained by Stephen Fleming and Zimbabwe by Heath Streak.

Test series

1st Test

2nd Test

One Day International (ODI) series

1st ODI

2nd ODI

3rd ODI

References

2000 in New Zealand cricket
2000 in Zimbabwean cricket
New Zealand cricket tours of Zimbabwe
International cricket competitions in 2000–01
Zimbabwean cricket seasons from 2000–01